This is a list of notable events in music that took place in the year 1963.

Specific locations
1963 in British music
1963 in Norwegian music

Specific genres
1963 in country music
1963 in jazz

Events
 January 3 – The Beatles begin their first tour of 1963 with a five-day tour in Scotland to support the release of their new single, "Love Me Do", beginning with a performance in Elgin.
January 4 – At Cortina d'Ampezzo in Italy, Dalida receives a Juke Box Global Oscar for the year's most-played artist on jukeboxes.
January 7 – Gary U.S. Bonds files a $100,000 lawsuit against Chubby Checker, claiming that Checker stole "Quarter to Three" and turned it into "Dancin' Party." The lawsuit is later settled out of court.
January 11 – "Please Please Me" is released in the United Kingdom by the Beatles, with "Ask Me Why" as the B-side.
January 12 – Bob Dylan portrays a folk singer in The Madhouse of Castle Street, a radio play for the BBC in London.
February 16
The Beatles achieve their first No. 1 hit single, when "Please Please Me" tops the charts in the UK.
Paul Anka marries Marie-Ann DeZogheb.
February 22 – The Beatles form Northern Songs Publishing Company.
March 5 – 1963 Camden PA-24 crash: Patsy Cline is killed in small plane crash near Camden, Tennessee, while on her way to Nashville, Tennessee, from Kansas City, Missouri, at the height of her career, together with Cowboy Copas and Hawkshaw Hawkins.
March 22 – The Beatles release their first album, Please Please Me, in the UK.
March 23 – The 8th Eurovision Song Contest is held in two studios at the BBC Television Centre, London. After much confusion regarding the results of the Norwegian jury, Denmark snatches victory from Switzerland after a close run. The Danish husband-and-wife duo Grethe and Jørgen Ingmann take the prize with "Dansevise".
April 29 – 19-year-old Andrew Loog Oldham signs a contract with the Rolling Stones, becoming their manager. Oldham had seen the band in concert the previous day at the Crawdaddy Club in London.
May 2 – The Beatles reach number one in the UK singles chart for the second time with "From Me To You".
May 11 – The Beatles album Please Please Me goes to the top of the UK Albums Chart.
May 15 – Opening of the National Academic Theatre of Opera and Ballet of Mongolia.
The 5th Annual Grammy Awards are held in Chicago, Los Angeles and New York, hosted by Frank Sinatra. Tony Bennett and Igor Stravinsky each win the most awards with three, with the former winning Record of the Year for his song "I Left My Heart in San Francisco". Vaughn Meader's The First Family wins Album of the Year and Anthony Newley and Leslie Bricusse's "What Kind of Fool Am I?" wins Song of the Year. Robert Goulet wins Best New Artist.
May 27 – The Freewheelin' Bob Dylan, singer-songwriter Bob Dylan's second and most influential studio album, is released by Columbia Records. The lead song, "Blowin' in the Wind", is released as a single by Peter, Paul and Mary in June and by Dylan himself in August.
May 29 – On the 50th anniversary of its stormy première, 88-year-old Pierre Monteux conducts the London Symphony Orchestra in The Rite of Spring at the Royal Albert Hall, with the composer Stravinsky (81) in the audience.
June 7 – The Rolling Stones' first single, a cover version of the Chuck Berry song "Come On", is released in the UK and reaches No. 21.
August 3 – The Beatles perform at The Cavern Club in Liverpool for the final time.
August 28 – March on Washington for Jobs and Freedom. Musical performers include Mahalia Jackson, Bob Dylan, Joan Baez, Peter, Paul and Mary and Marian Anderson.
August 30 – Philips introduces the Musicassette at the Berlin Funkaustellung.
September 6 – Nippon Crown record label is established as Crown Records, a subsidiary of Columbia Music Entertainment.
September 12 – The Beatles reach the UK number one for the third time with the single "She Loves You" (released on 23 August).
October 13 – Lesley Gore performs on The Ed Sullivan Show for the first time. She performs a medley of her smash hits "It's My Party" and "She's a Fool," which charted at #1 and #5, respectively.
October 15
British newspaper The Daily Mirror uses the term "Beatlemania" in a news story about the group's concert the previous day in Cheltenham; a Scottish music promoter later claims to have originated the term a week earlier.
Berliner Philharmonie concert hall opens.
November 30 – After an unbroken 30-week spell at the top of the UK Albums Chart, The Beatles album Please Please Me is knocked off the top of the charts by the group's latest album With the Beatles (released on 22 November).
December 12 – The Beatles reach number one in the UK for the fourth time with "I Want To Hold Your Hand" (released on 29 November).
date unknown
Dalida is rejected by Decca in the UK again.
Don Buchla begins to design an electronic music synthesizer in Berkeley, California.
Coxsone Dodd opens the first black-owned recording studio in Jamaica, named Studio One.
Lord Shorty's "Clock and Dagger" is widely considered the first soca recording.
I Nyoman Rembang leaves the Surakarta Conservatorium to teach at the College of Music SMKI in Bali.

Bands formed

Aeolian Singers
All-Ohio State Fair Youth Choir
Ambassadors of Harmony
Anaheim Kingsmen Drum and Bugle Corps
The Angels (American group)
The Artwoods
Baby Huey & the Babysitters
The Back Porch Majority
The Bats (South African band)
Billy Thorpe & the Aztecs
Bloomington Symphony Orchestra (Minnesota)
Bobby Taylor & the Vancouvers
Bombay Sisters
The Brothers-in-Law
Bryn Mawr Mainliners
Butch Engle & the Styx
Camerata Bern
Carlton Showband
Chicago Brass Quintet
The Clefs
The Clique (1960s UK band)
Crni Biseri
The Cryin' Shames
Daltoni
David and the Giants
The Deakins
Downliners Sect
Edmonton Strutters Drum and Bugle Corps
El Camino Youth Symphony
The Enthusiasts
The Escorts (Liverpool band)
Europa Cantat
Exile (American band)
Fairies (British band)
The Flames
The Fortunes
The Fourmost
Inez and Charlie Foxx
Framus Five
Franz Liszt Chamber Orchestra
Freddie and the Dreamers
The Fugs
The Gants
The Geezinslaw Brothers
The Gentrys
Gilbert and Sullivan for All
Hedgehoppers Anonymous
Hep Stars
The Hideaways
Hiroshima Symphony Orchestra
The Honeycombs
Irish Chamber Orchestra
The Irish Rovers
The Kinks
Kyiv Chamber Orchestra
The Leaves
The Liverbirds
Livermore-Amador Symphony
Liverpool Five
Mandarins Drum and Bugle Corps
Manfred Mann
Marek i Wacek
The Marionettes Chorale
Bob Marley and the Wailers
The Master Singers
The Mindbenders
The Moments (English band)
Johnny and Jonie Mosby
Mountain City Four
Neighb'rhood Childr'n
New Birth (band)
New York Youth Symphony
Orchestra Ethiopia
The Outcasts (Texas band)
Piccolo Coro dell'Antoniano
The Poets
The Pretty Things
The Pussycats
The Rockin' Vickers
The Rokes
Samonikli
The Scorpions (Manchester band)
Sfinx
The Shanes
The Shangri-Las
Slam Creepers
The Sorrows
South Carolina Philharmonic
The Spencer Davis Group
The Squires
Stanford Band
Stanford Mendicants
The Syndicats
Tages
Teddy and The Pandas
The Three Degrees
TPAO Batman
Trendsetters Limited
Tulsa Youth Symphony
Unbelievable Uglies
Unit 4 + 2
University of the Philippines Madrigal Singers
The V.I.P.'s
Valley Concert Chorale
Velvet Knights Drum and Bugle Corps
The Wilde Flowers
The Wolfe Tones
The Yardbirds

Bands disbanded
The Springfields

Albums released

Release date unknown

All Alone – Jo Stafford
Any Number Can Win – Jimmy Smith
As Long as She Needs Me – Sammy Davis, Jr. 
Baby, Baby, Baby – Jimmy Witherspoon
Bill Henderson with the Oscar Peterson Trio – Bill Henderson
The Black Saint and the Sinner Lady – Charles Mingus
Broadway, I Love You – Sergio Franchi
Bye Bye Birdie – Bobby Rydell
(By Popular Demand) More Trini Lopez at PJ's – Trini Lopez
Catch a Rising Star – John Gary (debut)
Checkered Flag – Dick Dale
The Composer of Desafinado Plays – Antonio Carlos Jobim
The Concert Sinatra – Frank Sinatra 
Criss-Cross – Thelonious Monk
Conversations with Myself – Bill Evans
Dakar – John Coltrane
Dion Sings "Love Came to Me" – Dion DiMucci
Ella Sings Broadway – Ella Fitzgerald
Ella Fitzgerald Sings the Jerome Kern Songbook – Ella Fitzgerald
Etta James Top Ten – Etta James
Eux – Dalida
Evenin' Blues – Jimmy Witherspoon
The Explosive Side of Sarah Vaughan – Sarah Vaughan
Extension – Clare Fischer
Folk Session Inside – The Country Gentlemen
Foolish Little Girl – The Shirelles 
For Your Sweet Love – Ricky Nelson
Getting Sentimental over Tommy Dorsey – Jo Stafford
Greatest Hits – The Shadows 
The Greatest Hits of the Golden Groups – Bobby Vinton 
Great Moments from Die Fledermaus – Sergio Franchi, Anna Moffo, Rise Stevens, etc.
Have You Heard? – Dick Morrissey Quartet
Here's Willie Nelson – Willie Nelson
Hollywood – My Way – Nancy Wilson 
Honey in the Horn – Al Hirt
I Am the Greatest – Cassius Clay
"Indifferentemente" – Mario Trevi
"Indifferentemente/Catene d'ammore" – Mario Trevi
I Wish Tonight Would Never End – George Jones
Impressions – John Coltrane 
India's Master Musician – Ravi Shankar
It's Gonna Work Out Fine – Ike & Tina Turner 
John Coltrane and Johnny Hartman – John Coltrane and Johnny Hartman
Johnny – Johnny Mathis 
Johnny's Newest Hits – Johnny Mathis 
Latin in a Satin Mood – Julie London
Love – Rosemary Clooney
Love on the Rocks – Julie London
Midnight Blue – Kenny Burrell
Mingus Mingus Mingus Mingus Mingus – Charles Mingus 
Monk's Dream – Thelonious Monk
My Boyfriend's Back – The Angels
My Point of View – Herbie Hancock
My Son, the Nut – Allan Sherman
Night Train – The Oscar Peterson Trio
On My Way & Shoutin' Again! – Count Basie 
On the Move – Trini Lopez
Oscar Peterson and Nelson Riddle – Oscar Peterson
Our Man in New Orleans – Al Hirt
Page One – Joe Henderson
Los Relámpagos del Norte – Los Relámpagos del Norte
Ramblin''' – The New Christy MinstrelsRocks the Blues – Ike TurnerRosemary Clooney Sings Country Hits from the Heart – Rosemary ClooneySammy Davis Jr. at the Cocoanut Grove – Sammy Davis, Jr.Say Wonderful Things – Patti PageSinatra's Sinatra – Frank Sinatra The Songs I Love – Perry Como Sonny Meets Hawk! – Sonny Rollins with Coleman Hawkins Surfin' With Bo Diddley – Bo DiddleySurging Ahead – Clare FischerTerry Gibbs Plays Jewish Melodies in Jazztime – Terry GibbsThe Dream Duet – Anna Moffo and Sergio FranchiThese Are the Blues – Ella FitzgeraldTrini Lopez at PJ's – Trini LopezVic Damone and Johnny Cole – Vic Damone, Johnny Cole Wanderlust – Frankie Laine 

Notable singles

Published popular songs
 "18 Yellow Roses"     Bobby Darin
 "Abilene" w.m. John D. Loudermilk, Lester Brown, Bob Gibson, Albert Stanton
 "All My Loving"     w.m. John Lennon & Paul McCartney
 "Another Saturday Night"     w.m. Sam Cooke
 "Anyone Who Had a Heart" w. Hal David m. Burt Bacharach
 "Call Me Irresponsible" w.Sammy Cahn m. Jimmy Van Heusen from the film Papa's Delicate Condition "Charade"     w. Johnny Mercer m. Henry Mancini. From the film of the same name.
 "Da Doo Ron Ron"     w.m. Phil Spector, Ellie Greenwich & Jeff Barry
 "Detroit City"     w.m. Mel Tillis & Danny Dill
 "Distant Drums"     w.m. Cindy Walker
 "Dominique"     Singing Nun
 "Don't Talk To Him"     Cliff Richard, Welch
 "Don't You Forget It"     w. Al Stillman m. Henry Mancini
 "Every Time I Think About You"     w.m. Claude Demetrius
 "Flash! Bang! Wallop!"     w.m. David Heneker.  Introduced by Tommy Steele in the London production of the musical Half a Sixpence.  Steele also performed the song in the Broadway production in 1965 and the 1967 film version (with modified lyrics).
 "Forget Him" w.m. Mark Anthony (a pseudonym of Tony Hatch)
 "From Me to You"     w.m. John Lennon & Paul McCartney
 "From Russia with Love  w.m. Lionel Bart
 "Good Morning, Good Day"     w. Sheldon Harnick m. Jerry Bock
 "Half A Sixpence"     w.m. David Heneker
 "How Do You Do It?"     w.m. Mitch Murray
 "I Call Your Name"     w.m. John Lennon & Paul McCartney
 "I Like It"     Mitch Murray
 "I Saw Her Standing There"     w.m. John Lennon & Paul McCartney
 "I Want to Hold Your Hand"     w.m. John Lennon & Paul McCartney
 "If I Ruled the World" w. Leslie Bricusse m. Cyril Ornadel.  Introduced by Harry Secombe in the musical Pickwick "It's My Party"     w.m. Herb Wiener, Wally Gold & John Gluck Jnr
 "Kissin' Cousins"     w.m. Fred Wise & Randy Starr
 "Losing You"     w.(Eng) Carl Sigman m. Jean Renard
 "Martian Hop"     w.m. Steven Rappaport, John Spirt, Robert Rappaport
 "Move Over Darling"     Hal Kanter
 "On Broadway"     w.m. Cynthia Weil, Barry Mann, Jerry Leiber and Mike Stoller
 "On the Beach"     Welch, Marvin, Richard
 "Our Day Will Come" w.m. Bob Hilliard & Mort Garson
 "The Pink Panther Theme"     w. Johnny Mercer m. Henry Mancini
 "Pretty Paper"     Willie Nelson
 "The Reverend Mr. Black"     Billy Edd Wheeler, Jerry Leiber and Mike Stoller (as Jed Peters)
 "Ring of Fire" w.m. Merle Kilgore & June Carter
 "She Loves Me" w. Sheldon Harnick m. Jerry Bock.  Introduced by Daniel Massey in the musical She Loves Me "She Loves You"     w.m. John Lennon & Paul McCartney
 "Surf City"     w.m. Jan Berry & Brian Wilson
 "Surfer Girl"     w.m. Brian Wilson
 "Talk Back Trembling Lips"     w.m. John D. Loudermilk
 "This Boy" w.m. John Lennon & Paul McCartney
 "The Times They Are A-Changin'"     w.m. Bob Dylan
 "The Ugly Bug Ball"  w.m. Richard M. Sherman and Robert B. Sherman, from the film Summer Magic "Viva Las Vegas"     Doc Pomus & Mort Shuman
 "Washington Square" w.m. Bob Goldstein & David Shire
 "When Joanna Loved Me" w. Robert Wells m. Jack Segal
 "Will He Like Me?" w. Sheldon Harnick m. Jerry Bock; introduced by Barbara Cook in the Broadway production of She Loves Me; performed by Anne Rogers in the 1964 London production
 "Wives And Lovers"     w. Hal David m. Burt Bacharach
 "You Were Made for Me"     Mitch Murray

Other notable songs (world)
"Ashita Ga Arusa" w. Yukio Aoshima m. Hachidai Nakamura
"En gång i Stockholm" w. Beppe Wolgers m. Bobbie Ericsson
"Miagete Goran Yoru no Hoshi o" w. Rokusuke Ei & Taku Izumi, m. Kyu Sakamoto
"Meglio Stasera" w. Franco Migliacci m. Henry Mancini
"Oye Como Va" w.m. Tito Puente

Classical music

Compositions
Benjamin Britten – Nocturnal after John Dowland, op. 70, for guitar
Nikolai Karetnikov – Symphony No. 4
Wojciech Kilar – Générique, for orchestra
Witold Lutosławski – Trois poèmes d'Henri Michaux for choir and orchestra
Francis Poulenc – Sept répons des ténèbresGiacinto Scelsi – String Quartet No. 3
John Serry Sr. – American Rhapsody, transcribed for free-bass accordion.
Karlheinz Stockhausen – Plus-MinusIgor Stravinsky – Abraham and IsaacWilliam Walton – Variations on a Theme by Hindemith, for orchestra
Wang Xilin – Yunnan Tone PoemOpera
Richard Rodney Bennett – The Mines of SulphurCarlisle Floyd – The Sojourner and Molly SinclairGian Carlo Menotti – The Last Savage (22 October, Paris, Opéra-Comique)
Malcolm Williamson – Our Man in HavanaAarre Merikanto – Juha (composed 1922)

Jazz

Musical theatre

 Oliver! (Music, Lyrics and Book: Lionel Bart) Broadway production opened at the Imperial Theatre on January 6 and ran for 744 performances
 She Loves Me (Music: Jerry Bock Lyrics: Sheldon Harnick Book: Joe Masteroff) Broadway production opened at the Eugene O'Neill Theatre on April 23 and ran for 302 performances
 Here's Love (Music, Lyrics and Book: Meredith Willson). Broadway production opened at the Shubert Theatre on October 3 and ran for 334 performances
 110 in the Shade (Music: Harvey Schmidt Lyrics: Tom Jones Book: N. Richard Nash). Broadway production opened at the Broadhurst Theatre on October 24 and ran for 331 performances
 The Girl Who Came to Supper (Music and Lyrics: Noël Coward). Broadway production opened at the Broadway Theatre on December 8 and ran for 112 performances
 Carnival! (Music and Lyrics: Bob Merrill Book: Michael Stewart).  London production opened at the Lyric Theatre on February 8 and ran for 34 performances
 Oh, What a Lovely War! (Music and Lyrics: Various Book: Charles Chilton). Opened at the Theatre Royal Stratford East on March 19 and transferred to Wyndham's Theatre, London on June 20 for a total run of 501 performances.
 Half A Sixpence (Music and Lyrics: David Heneker Book: Douglas Cross). London production opened at the Cambridge Theatre on March 21 and ran for 677 performances
 How To Succeed In Business Without Really Trying (Music and Lyrics: Frank Loesser Book: Abe Burrows, Jack Weinstein and Willie Gilbert). London production opened at the Shaftesbury Theatre on March 28 and ran for 520 performances.
 On the Town (Music: Leonard Bernstein Lyrics and Book: Betty Comden and Adolph Green). London production opened at the Prince Of Wales Theatre on May 30 and ran for 53 performances
 Pickwick (Music: Cyril Ornadel Lyrics: Leslie Bricusse Book: Wolf Mankowitz). London production opened at the Saville Theatre on July 4 and ran for 694 performances
 At the Drop of Another Hat (Music and Lyrics: Michael Flanders and Donald Swann). London revue opened at the Haymarket Theatre on October 2
 A Funny Thing Happened on the Way to the Forum (Music and Lyrics: Stephen Sondheim Book: Burt Shevelove and Larry Gelbart). London production opened at the Strand Theatre on October 3 and ran for 762 performances
 The Boys From Syracuse (Music: Richard Rodgers Lyrics: Lorenz Hart Book: George Abbott). London production opened at the Drury Lane Theatre on November 7 and ran for 100 performances

Musical films
 Bye Bye Birdie, starring Dick Van Dyke and Ann-Margret
 Fun in Acapulco, starring Elvis Presley and Ursula Andress
 Summer Holiday, British musical featuring Cliff RichardSummer Magic starring Hayley Mills, Burl Ives, Dorothy McGuire and Eddie Hodges

Births
January 4 – Till Lindemann, German rock musician (Rammstein) 
January 13 – Tim Kelly, American rock musician (Slaughter) (d. 1998)
January 15 – Conrad Lant, English singer-songwriter and bass player (Venom and Cronos)
January 17 – Kai Hansen, German power metal guitarist and singer
January 19 – Caron Wheeler, British singer-songwriter (Soul II Soul)
January 26
Jazzie B, English DJ and music producer (Soul II Soul)
Andrew Ridgeley, English singer-songwriter (Wham!)
January 28 – Dan Spitz, American thrash metal guitarist (Anthrax) and watchmaker
January 29 – Octave, Romanian guitarist, songwriter and producer
February 2 – Eva Cassidy, American singer and guitarist (d. 1996)
February 4 – Noodles, American guitarist (The Offspring)
February 8 – Joshua Kadison, American singer-songwriter and pianist
February 9 – Travis Tritt, American country singer
February 10 
 Smiley Culture, British rapper and reggae singer (d. 2011)
 Tony Reno, Swedish rock drummer (Europe)
February 19 – Seal, British singer
March 1 – Dan Michaels, producer, saxophonist, member of the rock band The Choir and The Swirling Eddies, owner of Galaxy21 Music.
March 4
Janey Lee Grace, British singer, author, television presenter and radio disc jockey
Jason Newsted, American rock bassist Metallica
March 10 – Jeff Ament (Pearl Jam, Green River)
March 11 
 Stacy Earl, American dance/pop singer
 David LaChapelle, Music video director, photographer and movie director
March 13 – Fito Páez, Argentine musician
March 15 – Bret Michaels, rock singer (Poison)
March 17
Michael Ivins, American rock bassist (The Flaming Lips)
Nick Peros, Canadian composer
March 18 – Vanessa Williams, American singer and actress
March 21 – Shawn Lane, American guitar virtuoso (d. 2003)
March 27
Charly Alberti, Argentinian musician
Dave Koz, American jazz musician 
March 30 – Eli-Eri Moura, Brazilian composer, conductor and music theorist
April 1 – Teddy Diaz, Filipino musician and composer (d. 1988)
April 3 – Criss Oliva, American metal guitarist (Savatage) (d. 1993)
April 6 – Andrew Weatherall, English disc jockey and remixer (d. 2020)
April 8 – Julian Lennon, singer-songwriter, son of John Lennon
April 10 – Warren DeMartini, American rock guitarist (Ratt)
April 16 – Jimmy Osmond, American singer
April 24 – Tõnu Trubetsky, Estonian rock musician (Vennaskond)
May 5 – Prince Ital Joe, reggae singer (d. 2001)
May 8 
Sylvain Cossette, Canadian singer-songwriter (Paradox)
Anthony Field, Australian musician and actor
May 9 – Barry Douglas Lamb, English musician, author and preacher
May 12 – Charles Pettigrew, American soul singer (Charles & Eddie) (d. 2001)
May 19 – Yazz, English singer
May 21 – Gilles Apap, violinist
June 4 – Sandeep Bhagwati, Indian classical musician and composer
June 5 – Joe Rudán, Hungarian heavy metal singer
June 7 – Roberto Alagna, operatic tenor
June 18 – Dizzy Reed, American keyboard player, songwriter and actor (Guns N' Roses, Johnny Crash)
June 20
Amir Derakh, rock musician (Orgy)
Julien-K
June 25 – George Michael, English singer and songwriter (d. 2016)
June 28 – Tierney Sutton, American singer
June 29 – Anne-Sophie Mutter, German violinist
June 30 – Yngwie J. Malmsteen, guitar performer
July 7 – Vonda Shepard, singer and musician
July 16 – Norman Cook (Fatboy Slim), English big-beat musician
July 17 – Regina Belle, American singer-songwriter and producer
July 19 – Bertrand Burgalat, French musician, composer and producer
July 22 – Emily Saliers, American singer-songwriter musician (Indigo Girls)
July 23 – Renato Borghetti, folk musician and composer
July 24 – Larry Rudolph, Britney Spears collaborator and pop music manager/agent
July 26 – Andy Timmons, American guitarist (Danger Danger)
July 28 – Shaunna Hall, American composer and musician (4 Non Blondes and Parliament-Funkadelic)
August 1 – Coolio, African American rapper (d. 2022)
August 3
Tasmin Archer, English singer
James Hetfield, American rock singer (Metallica)
August 9 – Whitney Houston, African American singer and actress (d. 2012)
August 12
Karen Briggs, African American jazz violinist
Sir Mix-a-Lot (Anthony Ray), African American MC and producer
August 19 – Joey Tempest, Swedish rock singer (Europe)
August 22
Tori Amos, American singer-songwriter, pianist and composer
James DeBarge (DeBarge)
August 26 – Liu Huan, Chinese singer
August 30 – Paul Oakenfold, British disc jockey
August 31
Reb Beach, American rock guitarist (Winger, Whitesnake)
Beverly Crawford, American gospel singer
September 1 – Carola Smit, Dutch musician
September 6 – Mark Chesnutt, American country musician
September 7 – Eazy-E, American West Coast rapper and record producer (d. 1995)
September 19 – Jarvis Cocker, British musician and singer (Pulp)
September 28 – Dan Forden, video game music composer (Mortal Kombat)
September 29
Les Claypool, American rock bassist and singer (Primus)
O'Landa Draper (O'Landa Draper and the Associates gospel choir) (d. 1998)
October 13 – Kemi Olusanya, English drum-and-bass musician (Kemistry & Storm) (d. 1999)
October 14 – Alessandro Safina, operatic tenor
October 20 – John Storgårds, Finnish conductor and violinist
October 23 – Thomas Di Leva, Swedish singer-songwriter
October 26 – Natalie Merchant, American indie singer-songwriter
October 27 – Marla Maples, American actress, musician and television personality.
October 30 – Jerry DeBorg (Jesus Jones)
November 1 – Rick Allen, British drummer (Def Leppard)
November 2 – Bobby Dall, American rock bassist (Poison)
November 12 – Sam Lloyd, American actor and singer (The Blanks)
December 9 – Kat Bjelland, American singer, songwriter, musician and guitarist. 
December 10 – Ole Amund Gjersvik, Norwegian bassist and composer
December 15 – Helen Slater, American singer, actress and songwriter
December 24 – Mary Ramsey, American musician, singer/songwriter (10,000 Maniacs, John & Mary)
December 26 – Lars Ulrich, Danish-born heavy metal drummer (Metallica)
December 31 – Scott Ian, American thrash metal guitarist (Anthrax)
Unknown – Naseer Shamma, Iraqi musician and oud player

Deaths
January 2 – Dick Powell, actor and singer, 58 (lung cancer)
January 6 – Lina Abarbanell, German-American soprano, 84
January 24 – Otto Harbach, lyricist, 89
January 30 – Francis Poulenc, French composer, 64
February 19 – Benny Moré, Cuban singer, 43 (cirrhosis of the liver)
February 20 – Ferenc Fricsay, conductor, 48 (cancer)
March 5 – Patsy Cline, American country/pop singer, 30 (plane crash)
March 17 – Lizzie Miles, singer, 67
March 28 – Alec Templeton, Welsh composer, 52
March 30 – Aleksandr Gauk, Russian conductor and composer, 69
March 31 – Harry Akst, US composer and pianist, 68
April 9
Eddie Edwards, American jazz trombonist, 71
Benno Moiseiwitsch, Jewish-Ukrainian pianist, 73
April 11 – Arvid Gram Paulsen, Norwegian jazz saxophonist and trumpeter, 41
April 12 – Herbie Nichols, jazz musician, 44 (leukemia)
May 6 – Ted Weems, US bandleader, 61
May 10 – Irving Aaronson, bandleader and composer, 68
May 24 – Elmore James, American blues guitarist, 45 (heart attack)
June 24 – Sybil Evers, mezzo-soprano and actress, 59
August 15 – John Powell, pianist, composer and ethnomusicologist, 80
August 23 – Glen Gray, American saxophonist and conductor, 63
September 3 – Frico Kafenda, Slovak composer, 79
September 12 – Modest Altschuler, cellist, conductor and composer, 90
September 25 – Alexander Sakharoff, Russian dancer and choreographer, 77
October 11 – Édith Piaf, French singing superstar, 47 (liver cancer)
October 25 – Roger Désormière, French conductor, 65
November 1 – Elsa Maxwell, songwriter, "the hostess with the mostest", 80
November 15 – Fritz Reiner, Hungarian conductor, 74
November 19 – Carmen Amaya, flamenco dancer and singer, 50
November 26 – Amelita Galli-Curci, operatic soprano, 81
November 29 – Ernesto Lecuona, Cuban composer, pianist and bandleader, 68
December 5 – Karl Amadeus Hartmann, composer, 58 (stomach cancer)
December 14 – Dinah Washington, singer, 39
December 28 – Paul Hindemith, composer, 68date unknown'' – Naftule Brandwein, clarinettist

Awards

Grammy Awards
Grammy Awards of 1963

Eurovision Song Contest
Eurovision Song Contest 1963

Leeds International Piano Competition
Michael Roll

See also 
Hot 100 No. 1 Hits of 1963
Billboard Top Country Singles of 1963
Billboard year-end top 50 R&B singles of 1963

References

External links
Pop Culture Madness 1963 Pop Music Chart

 
20th century in music
Music by year